Carlo Marino Bianchi (born 12 June 1970) is an Italian racing cyclist. He rode in the 1998 Tour de France.

References

1970 births
Living people
Italian male cyclists
Place of birth missing (living people)